Haplozetidae is a family of mites and ticks in the order Sarcoptiformes. There are at least 20 genera and 210 described species in Haplozetidae.

Genera

References

Further reading

 
 
 
 

Sarcoptiformes
Acari families